An Astrologer is a 1663 oil on panel painting by the Dutch artist Cornelis Bega, now in the National Gallery, London, to which it was presented by Martin Henry Colnaghi in 1896.

References

1663 paintings
Dutch Golden Age paintings
Collections of the National Gallery, London